Benja Bruijning (born 28 October 1983) is a Dutch actor.

Career 

Bruijning has played roles in the television series Flikken Maastricht (2009), Kinderen geen bezwaar (2010), Heer & Meester (2014), Dokter Deen (2012 – 2016), Vechtershart (2015 – 2017) and Nieuwe buren (2018 – 2019).  and Dirty Lines (2022).

Personal life 

Bruijning is in a relationship with actress Anna Drijver. Drijver gave birth to a daughter in November 2016. Drijver gave birth to a son in November 2019.

Selected filmography

Film 

 2011: The Gang of Oss
 2012: Family Way
 2016: The Fury

Television 

 2009: Flikken Maastricht
 2010: Kinderen geen bezwaar
 2012 – 2016: Dokter Deen
 2014: Heer & Meester
 2015 – 2017: Vechtershart
 2018 – 2019: Nieuwe buren
 2019: Heirs of the Night
 2022: Dirty Lines

References

External links 

 

1983 births
Living people
21st-century Dutch male actors
Dutch male actors
Dutch male film actors
Dutch male television actors